Heinrich Notter is a Swiss bobsledder who won competed during the 1980s. He won a bronze medal in the four-man event at the 1986 FIBT World Championships in Königssee.

References
Bobsleigh four-man world championship medalists since 1930

Living people
Swiss male bobsledders
Year of birth missing (living people)
Place of birth missing (living people)
20th-century Swiss people